Mac Ahlberg (12 June 1931 – 26 October 2012) was a Swedish film director and cinematographer.

Biography

In the years 1952–1954 he was married to Ulla Olofsson (1923–2009) and 1955–1961 to the actress Anna-Greta Bergman. He had a daughter Annina Rabe (born 1963) together with the script and TV producer Ruth Rabe (1934–1992). He was later married to Mary LaPoint Ahlberg until his death.

The first feature Ahlberg directed was the Danish erotic classic I, a Woman (Denmark, 1965) which went on to international success, especially in the United States.  He quickly became identified with erotic fare, directing two sequels to I, a Woman as well as a Swedish version of Fanny Hill (Sweden, 1968), starring Diana Kjær and Oscar Ljung. During the 1970s, he developed a conspicuous collaboration with actress Marie Forså.

Ahlberg moved to the United States in the late 1970s and worked mostly as a cinematographer on American productions; he was frequently hired by producer Charles Band, and worked on such Band productions as Re-Animator (1985), From Beyond (1986), and Dolls (1987), all three of which were directed by Stuart Gordon.

Death

Ahlberg died from complications of congestive heart failure on 26 October 2012. He was 81.

References

External links
 
 

Swedish film directors
Swedish cinematographers
1931 births
2012 deaths
Artists from Stockholm